Limnaecia cassandra is a moth in the family Cosmopterigidae. It was first described by Edward Meyrick, and is found in Sri Lanka.

References

Natural History Museum Lepidoptera generic names catalog

Limnaecia
Moths described in 1915
Taxa named by Edward Meyrick
Moths of Sri Lanka